Pierre-Auguste Adet (17 May 1763 Nevers – 19 March 1834 Paris) was a French scientist, politician, and diplomat.

He worked with Lavoisier on a new chemical notation system, and was secretary to the scientific periodical Annales de chimie, founded in 1789. He proved that glacial acetic acid and vinegar acetic acid were the same substance.

In 1796, Adet was elected a member of the American Philosophical Society.

He was secretary to the Minister of the Navy and the Colonies, Jean Dalbarade.
He was commissioner to Saint-Domingue.
He later became French ambassador to the United States, 
He sent Georges-Henri-Victor Collot on a reconnaissance of the Ohio River, and Mississippi River.

In 1803, he was Prefect of the Nièvre département. 
In 1809, he was a member of the Corps législatif.

References

External links
Adet's biography in the Dictionary of National Assembly Deputies (in French)

Further reading
 

1763 births
1834 deaths
18th-century French chemists
Officiers of the Légion d'honneur
Ambassadors of France to the United States